Simon John O'Neill  (born 1971) is a New Zealand-born operatic tenor. In 1998, his image appeared on the New Zealand one-dollar performing arts postage stamp.

Biography

O'Neill was born in Ashburton, New Zealand, and received his musical training at the University of Otago, Victoria University of Wellington, graduating with an honours degree in music, before receiving scholarships to the Manhattan School of Music (where he earned a Master of Music degree in 2000) and the Juilliard Opera Center. In late 2016 he was awarded Doctor of Music (Honoris Causa) from Victoria University of Wellington. O'Neill was appointed Officer of the New Zealand Order of Merit in the 2017 Queen's Birthday Honours.

While studying at the Juilliard Opera Center, he sang the title role in Idomeneo, Sam Polk in Susannah, and Chevalier de la Force in Dialogues of the Carmelites under the baton of Julius Rudel. Subsequently, at San Francisco's Merola Opera Program, he performed Rodolfo in La bohème as well as the title role in La clemenza di Tito with Wolf Trap Opera. In 2004, O'Neill was the subject of a TVNZ, BBC documentary The Understudy about his contract at the Metropolitan Opera to cover Siegmund for Plácido Domingo in the Met's Otto Schenk production of Die Walküre.

O'Neill made his Metropolitan Opera debut as the Gran Sacerdote in Mozart's Idomeneo with James Levine, his Royal Opera House debut as Jenik in Smetana's The Bartered Bride   with Sir Charles Mackerras followed by Florestan (Fidelio) with Antonio Pappano and Salzburg Festival in Die Zauberflöte with Riccardo Muti and his Vienna Staatsoper debut as the title role in Parsifal with Christian Thielemann.

He performed the role of Siegmund in Richard Wagner's Die Walküre   at the Royal Opera House, Covent Garden, with Sir Antonio Pappano, Teatro alla Scala and Berlin Staatsoper with Daniel Barenboim, Vienna Staatsoper with Franz Welser-Möst, Bayerische Staatsoper with Kent Nagano,  Hamburgische Staatsoper with Simone Young, the Deutsche Oper and the Metropolitan Opera with Donald Runnicles and in the 2013 Otto Schenk Ring production and in the Robert Lepage production with Fabio Luisi.

He made his 2009 debut in the title role of Verdi's Otello  with Sir Colin Davis and the London Symphony Orchestra and in 2010 he debuted at the Bayreuth Festival in the title role of "Lohengrin", returning in the title role of Parsifal in 2011. The same year, O'Neill made his role debut as Walter von Stolzing in Die Meistersinger von Nürnberg at Covent Garden.

His performances have included; the title roles of Parsifal, Lohengrin at the Royal Opera House with Sir Antonio Pappano, Otello and Lohengrin at Houston Grand Opera, the title role in Verdi's Otello and Sergei in his Opera Australia debut in Lady Macbeth of Mtsensk, Florestan with Daniel Barenboim at the BBC Proms with the West-Eastern Divan Orchestra and made his Carnegie Hall debut as Caesar in Samuel Barber's Antony and Cleopatra for New York City Opera, returning with the Metropolitan Opera Orchestra and James Levine for Mahler's Das Lied von der Erde and sang in Beethoven's Missa solemnis with the Boston Symphony.

O'Neill is the patron of the New Zealand Association of Teachers of Singing (Newzats), The New Zealand Opera School, the New Zealand Singing School, New Zealand Circle 100, the New Zealand Brass Foundation, St Kilda Brass, the Auckland Boys' Choir, the Ashburton MSA Choir, the Christchurch City Choir and the UK Singingworks. He appears on the 1998 New Zealand one-dollar performing arts postage stamp.

In the 2017 Queen's Birthday Honours, O'Neill was appointed an Officer of the New Zealand Order of Merit for services to opera.

O'Neill contributed as tenor soloist to the Deutsche Grammophon recording of Mahler's "Symphony No.8" with the Los Angeles Philharmonic conducted by  Gustavo Dudamel. The recording received two nominations for the 2022 Grammy Awards for Best Choral Performance and Best Engineered Album in Classical. It won the Best Choral Performance Award.

Recordings

Distant Beloved Beethoven Schumann Strauss Wagner (Decca) Terence Dennis
Mahler: Symphony No. 8 Deutsche Grammophon Los Angeles Philharmonic, Gustavo Dudamel
Wagner: Wagnermania (NoMadMusic) Orchestre national d'Île-de-France, Case Scaglione
Mahler: Symphony No. 8 Munich Philharmonic, Valery Gergiev
Father and Son - Wagner Scenes and Arias (EMI) New Zealand Symphony Orchestra, Pietari Inkinen
Wagner: Siegfried(Halle) The Hallé, Mark Elder
Wagner: Siegfried(Naxos) Hong Kong Philharmonic, Jaap van Zweden
Wagner: Parsifal (Opus Arte) The Royal Opera Covent Garden, Sir Antonio Pappano
Wagner: Die Walküre (Arthaus Musik) Der Ring des Nibelungen Teatro alla Scala, Daniel Barenboim
Verdi: Otello (LSO Live) London Symphony Orchestra, Sir Colin Davis
Weber: Der Freischütz (LSO Live) London Symphony Orchestra, Sir Colin Davis
Mahler: Symphony No. 8 (Phantom) Sydney Symphony, Vladimir Ashkenazy
Beethoven: Symphony No. 9 Sony, Die Deutsche Kammerphilharmonie Bremen, Paavo Järvi
Beethoven: Symphony No. 9 Analekta, Orchestre Symphonique de Montreal, Kent Nagano
Martin: Der Sturm (Netherlands Radio Philharmonic Orchestra), Thierry Fisher Hyperion Records
Mozart: The Magic Flute (Decca) Salzburg Festival, Riccardo Muti
Chausson: Le roi Arthus (Telarc) BBC Symphony Orchestra, Leon Botstein
Kiri and Friends (EMI) Auckland Philharmonia

Awards
 2017 Officer of the New Zealand Order of Merit Queen's Birthday Honours List
 2016 Doctor of Music (Honoris Causa) Victoria University of Wellington
 2005 Arts Foundation of New Zealand Laureate Award
 Grand finalist in the 2002 Metropolitan Opera National Council Auditions
 2003 United Kingdom Wagner Society Prize
 2000 Masters of Music Manhattan School of Music
 1999 Metropolitan Opera National Council Auditions Encouragement Award
 1998 Fulbright Scholarship
 1995 Bachelor of Music with Honours Victoria University of Wellington
 1994 Bachelor of Music University of Otago

References

Links

Sources
 "Tenors in training", nysun.com
 Profile, nytimes.com
 Profile, newyorker.com
 Profile, iht.com 
 Profile, artsfoundation.org.nz
 Profile, stuff.co.nz

External links
 
 
 

1971 births
Living people
EMI Classics and Virgin Classics artists
Manhattan School of Music alumni
New Zealand operatic tenors
People from Ashburton, New Zealand
Victoria University of Wellington alumni
People educated at Ashburton College
Officers of the New Zealand Order of Merit
University of Otago alumni
Juilliard School alumni
Winners of the Metropolitan Opera National Council Auditions
21st-century New Zealand male singers
Grammy Award winners
Fulbright alumni